The New River Valley is a region along the New River in Southwest Virginia in the United States.

It is usually defined as the counties of Montgomery (including the towns of Blacksburg and Christiansburg), Pulaski, Floyd, and Giles and the independent city of Radford, which are all located in the New River watershed. However, in Virginia, the New River also flows through Wythe, Carroll, and Grayson Counties, and its physical watershed includes parts of Tazewell and Bland Counties, and small portions of Smyth and Craig Counties. Outside of Virginia, the New River continues upstream into North Carolina and downstream into West Virginia.

Part of the Great Appalachian Valley, it became a contested frontier area in colonial times, and continued during the westward expansion of the United States.  The first European to explore the valley was Abraham Wood of Fort Henry in 1671 and settlements began to develop in the 18th century. A branch of the Great Wagon Road led through the New River Valley. The valley was the location of several small American Civil War battles.

According to the 2000 census, the New River Valley is home to approximately 165,145 residents.  The New River Valley is also home to several institutions of higher learning including Virginia Tech, Radford University, Edward Via College of Osteopathic Medicine and New River Community College.

External links 
New River Valley Web Portal

Valleys of Virginia
River valleys of the United States
Landforms of Montgomery County, Virginia
Landforms of Pulaski County, Virginia
Landforms of Floyd County, Virginia
Landforms of Giles County, Virginia
Radford, Virginia
Southwest Virginia
Western Virginia